Cimarron Ridge is a ridge in the San Juan Mountains in southwestern Colorado. The ridge runs north-south and occupies parts of Gunnison, Montrose, Ouray, and Hinsdale counties. The ridge parallels U.S. Highway 550, and parts of the ridge can be seen from points along the highway.

Prominent peaks
Peaks along the ridge include Courthouse Mountain, elevation , and Chimney Rock, elevation . Chimney Rock is known for appearing in the 1969 western motion picture True Grit and is considered among the most difficult peaks to climb in Colorado.

Geology
The ridge is made up of green and gray tuff breccia and is the "erosional remains of a larger volcanic pile that surrounded several volcanoes." The Cimarron Ridge Formation takes its name from the ridge.

References

San Juan Mountains (Colorado) 
Ridges of Colorado
Mountains of Gunnison County, Colorado
Mountains of Montrose County, Colorado
Mountains of Ouray County, Colorado
Mountains of Hinsdale County, Colorado